Thiago Pinto Borges (born 22 October 1988), commonly known simply as Thiago, is a Brazilian footballer who plays for Croatian Third Football League club Novigrad.

Career
In November 2016, Thiago moved on a free transfer to the newly promoted Faroe Islands club 07 Vestur. In May 2017, he joined Danish club Avarta. He left the club in the summer 2019 and returned to Croatian club NK Mosor in October 2019. On 1 August 2021, Thiago signed with Croatian Third Football League club Novigrad.

References

External links
Thiago Pinto Borges at Danmarks Radio

1988 births
Living people
Brazilian footballers
Esbjerg fB players
NK Mosor players
Trelleborgs FF players
FC Vestsjælland players
Akademisk Boldklub players
Skive IK players
Knattspyrnufélagið Þróttur players
BK Avarta players
Danish Superliga players
Danish 2nd Division players
Allsvenskan players
Úrvalsdeild karla (football) players
Brazilian expatriate footballers
Expatriate men's footballers in Denmark
Expatriate footballers in Croatia
Expatriate footballers in Sweden
Expatriate footballers in Iceland
Expatriate footballers in the Faroe Islands
Association football midfielders
Brazilian expatriate sportspeople in Denmark
Brazilian expatriate sportspeople in Croatia
Brazilian expatriate sportspeople in Sweden
Brazilian expatriate sportspeople in Iceland
Brazilian expatriate sportspeople in the Faroe Islands
NK Novigrad players
Second Football League (Croatia) players
Footballers from São Paulo